Souled Out was a professional wrestling pay-per-view promoted by World Championship Wrestling.

Souled Out may also refer to:

 Souled Out (Aberdeen), a non-denominational Christian organisation based in Aberdeen, Scotland
 Souled Out (Hezekiah Walker album), 2008
 Souled Out (Jhené Aiko album), 2014
 Souled Out (Tower of Power album), 1995
 "Souled Out (song)", by California group Supreme Love Gods (1992)
 "Souled Out!!!", a song by Conor Oberst on his self-titled album (2008)
 Souled Out (Blacklite District album), 2019